Thornhill is a village and former township in the unparished area of Dewsbury, Kirklees, West Yorkshire, England. Historically part of the West Riding of Yorkshire, Thornhill was absorbed into Dewsbury County Borough in 1910. It is located on a hill on the south side of the River Calder, and has extensive views of Dewsbury, Ossett and Wakefield. It is known for its collection of Anglo-Saxon crosses.

History
Thornhill is mentioned in the Domesday Book of 1086 as within the ancient wapentake of Agbrigg, while Anglian crosses and other remains indicate that there was a settlement here by the 9th century. A hoard of 27 Roman denarii found in Turnip Lane and pottery at the cross indicates substantially earlier settlement. The tombstone of a certain very high-ranking Anglian called Osberht (a very rare find) was found in the graveyard of Thornhill Parish Church. Some historians claim that the grave bearing the name Osbehrt is that of King Osberht, who was killed on 21 March 867 while fighting the Viking Great Heathen Army led by Ivar the Boneless. The gravestone (among other contemporaneous high-status Anglian gravestones) is on display in the church. The local place-names of Ludd Well (shown in a 1602 map) and the Combs indicate Celtic settlement. This is reinforced by the dedication of the Parish Church to St Michael, which is typical for churches in high places in formerly Celtic parts of northern England. The Celtic kingdom of Elmet (covering modern West Yorkshire) collapsed in AD 617. In 1320 Edward II granted a charter for a market and a fair.

In the reign of Henry III, Thornhill Hall was the seat of the Thornhill family, who intermarried with the De Fixbys and Babthorpes in the reigns of Edward I and Edward II. In the reign of Edward III, Elizabeth Thornhill, the only child of Simon Thornhill, married Sir Henry Savile. This extinguished the family line of Thornhills of Thornhill which now passed its property down the Savile line. Thornhill now became the seat of the powerful Savile family.

The Saviles later intermarried with the Calverley family as well, so that when Sir John Savile died in 1503 in Thornhill, he left provision in his will for his sister Alice, married to Sir William Calverley. Sir William Savile, the third baronet of the family, fortified the hall.

Seizure of Thornhill Hall
The Saviles remained here until the English Civil War when the house was besieged. As royalist heroine since the siege of Sheffield Castle in 1644, Lady Anne Savile's troops under Capt. Thomas Paulden (brother of William Paulden) in August 1648 defended Thornhill Hall against the Parliamentary forces under Col. Sir Thomas Fairfax. They were forced to surrender and the hall was destroyed.

The Old Rectory survived and was home to several prominent vicars, most notably John Michell, who first rose to international prominence by developing an understanding of earthquakes, then devised an experiment to accurately determine the mass of planet Earth, but perhaps most intriguingly for Thornhill, attracted Benjamin Franklin (founding father of the USA), Joseph Priestley, Jan Ingenhousz, John Smeaton and others to a scientific meeting and overnight stay in 1771. Benjamin Franklin's stay in Thornhill remained unknown until 2015.

Some ruins of the house and the moat still remain at Thornhill Rectory Park. The moat still retains water.

Monuments to members of the Thornhill and Savile families are in Thornhill Parish Church.

Industrial Revolution
Thornhill has close ties to coal mining. The demand for coal increased due to the development of the steam engine. The local population increased as more workers were recruited for the mines. In 1893 an explosion at Combs Pit killed 139 coal miners. Thornhill Colliery resulted from the merging of Inghams and Combs Collieries in 1948 but closed in 1971.

Governance
Historically Thornhill (St. Michael) was a large ecclesiastical parish in the wapentake of Agbrigg, West Riding of Yorkshire which joined the Dewsbury Poor Law Union in 1837. In 1894 it was an urban district and in 1910 it was incorporated into Dewsbury County Borough.

Geography
Thornhill is situated on a hill on the south side of the River Calder and the Calder and Hebble Navigation. The township covered  and the underlying rock comprises coal measures. Thornhill encompasses the areas of Thornhill Edge, Overthorpe and Fox Royd overlooking the valleys of the Howroyd Beck and Smithy Brook.

Schools

The Thornhill area has two junior schools: Overthorpe (C of E) Junior and Infants and Thornhill Junior and Infants School. Thornhill Community Academy is the area's secondary school, with a GCSE pass rate of 84% in 2010, an increase of 22 percentage points from 2009. Recently the school has undergone various modifications, and is now a Science College. Much of the school has been refurbished and modernised. Construction of a new sports hall was completed in April 2007 and includes a new Multi-Use Games Area (MUGA).

Pubs
Thornhill has several public houses. The small Black Horse is in the south. The Scarborough is a medium-sized traditional public house on the edge of Frank Lane. The Flatt Top is a small public house on the corner of Albion Road that serves traditionally-brewed local ales. Next to the church is the Savile Arms, which serves a range of traditionally-brewed real ales and regular guest ales. The Alma is closed and was in the north of Thornhill. There are also several working men's clubs.

Sports
Thornhill is home to the Thornhill Trojans a rugby league team who are currently in the National Conference League Premier Division. The area also boasts several football teams Overthorpe Sports who play in the West Riding County Amateur League (Premier Division) on Saturdays and Overthorpe Town who play in the Heavy Woollen Sunday League (First Division).

The club has recently been awarded FA Charter Standard status as an adult club and has ambitious plans to increase participation in the game in the next three years.
Thornhill United is located at rectory park. There are several rugby league youth teams. The Thornhill rugby club, located in Overthorpe Park, houses the changing rooms for the local rugby and football teams.

Community facilities open to the public include a football pitch, rugby pitch and basketball court, a mini rugby pitch frequently used by the rugby club itself for the under tens junior team and the new sports hall, with the Multi-Use Games Area located at the local secondary school (the Community Science College at Thornhill).

Thornhill is home to the Savile Bowmen, an archery club that shoots at Thornhill Cricket and Bowls Club. Three tennis courts are situated next to Thornhill Cricket and Bowls Club. This is home to Thornhill Tennis Club which currently have two teams in the Huddersfield and District Tennis League.

Amenities
There are a number of local shops and off-licences in Thornhill and numerous takeaways ranging from traditional English to Italian cuisine. The nearest large supermarkets are in Dewsbury, which is connected by public transport. The area has two post offices with limited services. Overthorpe Post Office has recently undergone building work and is now part of the Onestop franchise.
Other shops and services include a florist, dental surgery, beauty salon, a computer repair shop, a tattoo studio, a fish and chip shop and a couple of Indian takeaways.

Survey of English Dialects site
The area was also covered by the Survey of English Dialects owing to the belief that it was a hotbed of Yorkshire dialect. A 2005 study compared the 1964 Thornhill recording with a recording from nearby Ossett in 1999.

Church protests
In 2014 there were protests after items were removed from gravestones at Thornhill Parish Church, under the orders of the Diocese of West Yorkshire and the Dales.

Notable people

 John Rudd (1498–1579), cartographer and Rector of Thornhill
 Christopher Saxton (–), cartographer and apprentice to John Rudd
 Sir George Radcliffe (1599–1657), politician and lawyer, born in Thornhill.
 Sir William Savile, 3rd Baronet (1612–1644), politician and soldier, born in Thornhill
 George Savile, 1st Marquess of Halifax (1633–1695), statesman and writer, born in Thornhill.
 John Michell (1724–1793), geologist, astronomer and Rector of Thornhill.
 Sir Francis Sykes, 1st Baronet (1732–1804), East India Company "Nabob" and politician, born in Thornhill
 John Baines (1787–1838), mathematician taught at Thornhill Grammar School
 Barron Kilner (1852–1922), rugby union international and a Mayor of Wakefield, born in Thornhill
 Christopher Brooke (1869–1948) soldier and Conservative MP for Pontefract
 Edward J. Thomas (1869–1958) classicist, librarian and writer on the history of Buddhism.
 Hector Munro Chadwick (1870–1947), philologist and historian, born in Thornhill
 Alex Smith (born 1947) a former footballer with over 350 club caps

See also
Listed buildings in Dewsbury

References

External links

 

Villages in West Yorkshire
Geography of Dewsbury
Heavy Woollen District